Italian Cricket Federation is the governing body for the sport of cricket within Italy. They are responsible, with assistance from the European Cricket Council, for the development and administration of the game within Italy, and the selection of the Italian national cricket team.

The Italian Cricket Federation also runs an academy for youth development located 180 km North of Rome, at Grosseto Cricket Club.

History

Domestic cricket

Ayubowan Mantua CC
Azzurra
Bologna CC
Castle CC
Fiorentina Cricket Club
Casteller Cricket Club Paese
Ceylon Cricket Club Padova
Eagles CC
Euratom Cricket Club
Gallicano
Genoa CC (i grifoni)
Gruppo Lazio B. S. & Cricket
Hockey Club Butterfly
Howzat Cricket & Sports Academy
IB CC
Idle CC
Karalis Cricket Club
Latina Lanka CC
Lions Brescia
Maremma CC
Messapia Cricket Taranto
Milan CC
Milan Kingsgrove CC
Modugno Cricket
tal Bangla Boys CC
PakFriends Cricket Club Trentino Alto -Adige
Parma Jinnah CC
Pianoro CC
P.G.S. Lux
Pol. Excelsior 2000
Polisportiva Città2Mari
Polisportiva Gambassi
Polisportiva Università Tor Vergata
Renato Moro Taranto Cricket 
 Roma Capannelle Cricket Club
Rome Bangla CC
Rovereto CC
Sinhala Sports Club Viterbo
Smit Roma Centro
Sri Lanka Cricket Club Libertas
Sporting Club Judicaria
Stradaioli Cricket Club Aprilia
The Guidizzolo CC
Trentino CC
Tuscolana Cricket Club
Unione Polisportiva Narnese Cricket
Venezia CC
Gardone CC

Jaguars Parma CC
LuxRoma cricket club
Diffendes sporting club

See also
Italian national cricket team

References

External links
 
 Cricinfo Italy

Cricket in Italy
Italy
Cricket
Sports organizations established in 1980